Sobaran Singh Yadav is an Indian politician and a member of the Sixteenth Legislative Assembly of Uttar Pradesh in India. He represents the Karhal constituency of Uttar Pradesh and is a member of the Samajwadi Party political party.

Early life and  education
Sobaran Singh Yadav was born in Etawah district. He attended the  Allahabad University and attained Bachelor of Arts degree.

Political career
Sobaran Singh Yadav has been a MLA for three terms. He represented the Karhal constituency and is a member of the Samajwadi Party political party.

Posts held

See also
 Karhal (Assembly constituency)
 Sixteenth Legislative Assembly of Uttar Pradesh
 Uttar Pradesh Legislative Assembly

References 

Samajwadi Party politicians
Uttar Pradesh MLAs 2002–2007
Uttar Pradesh MLAs 2007–2012
Uttar Pradesh MLAs 2012–2017
Uttar Pradesh MLAs 2017–2022
University of Allahabad alumni
People from Etawah district
1951 births
Living people
Bharatiya Janata Party politicians from Uttar Pradesh